Sandford Hall is a historic building in Mitchell, Nebraska. It was built in 1934 as a dance hall to replace the old Mitchell Dance Pavilion. It was dedicated by the American Legion on March 28, 1934, with performances by Herbie Kay and Dorothy Lamour. Over the years, performers included Stan Kenton, Ted Weems, Tommy Dorsey, Lawrence Welk, Kay Kyser, Artie Shaw, Les Brown, Glenn Miller, Harry James, Henry Busse, Art Kassel, Benny Goodman and Gene Krupa. The building has been listed on the National Register of Historic Places since July 9, 1997.

References

Dance venues in the United States
Buildings and structures completed in 1934
National Register of Historic Places in Scotts Bluff County, Nebraska
1934 establishments in Nebraska